Meja is a constituency of the Uttar Pradesh Legislative Assembly covering the city of Meja in the Allahabad district of Uttar Pradesh, India.

Meja is one of five assembly constituencies in the Allahabad Lok Sabha constituency. Since 2008, this assembly constituency is numbered 259 amongst 403 constituencies.

Currently this seat belongs to Samajwadi Party candidate Sandeep Singh who won in last Assembly election of 2022 Uttar Pradesh Legislative Elections defeating Bhartiya Janata Party candidate Neelam Karwariya by a margin of 3295 votes.

References

External links
 

Assembly constituencies of Uttar Pradesh
Politics of Allahabad district